Florian Narcissot (born 20 May 1991) is a professional footballer who plays as a defender for Club Franciscain in the Martinique Championnat National and internationally for Martinique.

He made his debut for Martinique in 2017, in a 2-1 defeat to Barbados on 27 March 2017. He was in the Martinique Gold Cup squad for the 2017  tournament.

References

1991 births
Living people
Martiniquais footballers
Martinique international footballers
Association football defenders
Club Franciscain players